KDFO (98.5 FM, "98-5 The Fox") is a radio station broadcasting a classic rock music format. KDFO is licensed to Delano, California, and serves the Bakersfield, California, area. The station is owned by iHeartMedia, Inc.

History

98.5 KDNO
98.5 KDNO was a Christian radio station located in Delano, California, operated by Richard Palmquist, who purchased the station from Chester Newell in 1970. Adopting the slogan Uplift 98.5, the station was on the air until Palmquist sold it in 1997 to Mondosphere Corporation and went into retirement. Today, the KDNO call letters belong to a station in Wyoming.  KDNO was owned by a California Corporation, Tape Networks INC., founded by Palmquist when he was a broadcast consultant in Glendale, California. After building KDNO for a client, that owner suffered the loss of his bank loan. Palmquist arranged for his friend Chester Newell to purchase the station, and Palmquist became the manager. Later, Newell sold the station to Tape Networks, Inc. Palmquist raised the purchase price by soliciting help from KDNO listeners. The station, however, was devoted to ministry rather than revenue, so to supplement his income Palmquist purchased the Pixley Enterprise Newspaper and later the Terra Bella News. He merged them to form the "Enterprise News," and the newspaper became commercially successful, thus helping to support the radio ministry. After two unsuccessful efforts to sell the newspaper, Palmquist closed that business in 1993 to concentrate on improving the radio station's music and Bible teaching ministry. However, income from listener support, though supporting current expenses, could not pay off the half million dollar long term debt on the station. So when Palmquist reached retirement age, he sold the station to honor his obligation to those who had helped purchase and build the station. After the sale of KDNO, Palmquist transferred much of the KDNO programming to an online format: www.truthradio.com and www.truthradio.info.

Star 98.5 KKDJ/Smooth Jazz 98.5 KSMJ
 After Mondosphere took over, the station was downgraded from a class B at 50 kW to a class B1 with 8 kW ERP and the transmitter was moved to the 105.3 site closer to Bakersfield and was known as Star 98.5 KKDJ and was an oldies station.  In 1998, KKDJ moved to 105.3 FM and KSMJ moved to 98.5 FM and was known as Smooth Jazz 98.5 KSMJ.

98.5 The Fox
On March 24, 2000, the KSMJ format  changed to a classic rock format and the call letters were later changed to KDFO and the station branded as "98.5 The Fox". On February 15, 2008, the call letters KBKO and the country music format were briefly moved from 96.5 FM to 98.5 FM in a frequency swap with KDFO where it was branded as "98.5 KBKO".  On June 20, 2008, the two stations were moved back to their previous frequencies after a four-month swap.

Airstaff
 This station features the syndicated Bob and Tom show which is on weekday mornings.
Anne Erickson is on mid-days. During lunch hour she hosts "The Fox Lunchbox" playing four songs in a row from an artist, genre or theme." She also covers the daily news headlines with her "Daily Update" with comedic takes on the top stories.
Mike Bell is on during the afternoon with his show "The Road Show with Mike Bell!" He hosts the program from within a clown car, and is live with regular comedic features "Celebrity Birthdays", "The Amazing Useless Fact Of The Day", and "Bellski's Police Blotter", plus "The Drive @FIVE!", an hour-long live request program.
Big Rig is on evenings.
B-Man is on overnights
Weekends/Fill-in include Mark Coppola, Brian Dickerman, Dana McKensie, Morgen, Tony TnT Tillerson, The John Clay Wolfe Show, Uncle Joe Benson

References

External links
98.5 The Fox KDFO official website

Radio stations established in 1968
Classic rock radio stations in the United States
DFO
1968 establishments in California
IHeartMedia radio stations